José Carlos dos Anjos Sávio, better known as Zé Carlos (Criciúma, September 9, 1985), is a Brazilian footballer who plays as a goalkeeper for Metropolitano.

Career
The goalkeeper was revealed in the basic categories of Crickhowell. He made his debut as a starter in March 2004 in the game against Camboriuense where the Crickhowell won 3-0. Over time they played for Criciúma, Ze Carlos scored three goals, one of which was what helped the team winning the title of the Series C do Brasileiro 2006. Also participated in the Brazil national under-17 football team in 2003.

In 2009, he was hired by Avai, but was loaned to the dispute of Paraná to Brazilian Serie B. At the end of their participation in the Paraná team was announced as a reinforcement of Avaí for the 2010 season.

On 12 May 2011, he left Brazilian Série A side Avai and joined his former club Paraná in the Série B on free transfer to play as a regular starter.

Career statistics
(Correct )

List of goals scored

Following, is the list with the goals scored by Zé Carlos:

Honours
Criciúma
Campeonato Brasileiro Série C: 2006
Campeonato Catarinense: 2005

Avaí
Campeonato Catarinense: 2010

References

External links
 Avaí
goal
 ogol.com
 soccerway
 Sambafoot
 WebSoccerClub

1985 births
Living people
Brazilian footballers
Criciúma Esporte Clube players
Avaí FC players
Paraná Clube players
Paysandu Sport Club players
Agremiação Sportiva Arapiraquense players
Campeonato Brasileiro Série A players
People from Criciúma
Association football goalkeepers
Sportspeople from Santa Catarina (state)